Nocturnal is the second extended play by Canadian recording artist Roy Woods. It was released on December 23, 2016 by OVO Sound and Warner Bros. Records. The EP features guest appearances from Canadian R&B duo and OVO label-mates Majid Jordan and MadeinTYO. The first music video to be put out from the album was for the song "Love You" which released April 27, 2017. The album serves as a follow-up to his debut commercial mixtape Waking at Dawn (2016). The artwork was created by Corrado Grilli.

Track listing

Notes
  signifies a co-producer.

References

Hip hop EPs
2016 EPs
Roy Woods albums
OVO Sound EPs